Kalinów may refer to the following places:
Kalinów, Tomaszów Mazowiecki County in Łódź Voivodeship (central Poland)
Kalinów, Zgierz County in Łódź Voivodeship (central Poland)
Kalinów, Masovian Voivodeship (east-central Poland)